Yaroslav Vladimirovich Rybakov (born November 22, 1980 in Mogilyev, Belarusian SSR) is a retired Russian high jumper.

He is the 2002 European Champion high jumper, and at the 2005 World Championships he shared the silver medal with Victor Moya of Cuba.

In 2006 he won the World Indoor Championships, and finished fifth in the high jump final at the 2006 European Athletics Championships in Gothenburg. The next year he won his third World Championships silver medal in a new personal best jump of 2.35 metres. In 2009, he finally won gold at the World Championships in Berlin.

His indoor personal best is 2.38 metres, set in February 2005 in Stockholm. Since then he has equalled the mark three times, which has included a meet record for the Hochsprung mit Musik.

Records
Rybakov set the Russian national record of 2.38, indoors, at the 16th GE Galan meet at the Globe Arena in Stockholm, Sweden on Tuesday 15 February 2005. It was the highest indoor leap in the world since March 2000, and improved his personal best by one cm. He was pushed to the record by Czech jumper Jaroslav Baba, who finished second at 2.34. Rybakov set the record by making 5-consecutive first try clearances at 2.21, 2.26, 2.29, 2.32 and 2.34, and then clearing 2.39 on his third, and final, attempt.

Two years later, Rybakov would push his younger compatriot Ivan Ukhov to break his national record at the Moscow Winter Cup meet on 28 January 2007. In a tactical duel, Rybakov would finish second at 2.35 (with one attempt at 2.37 and two at 2.39), while 20-year-old Ukhov had a first try clearance at 2.39. One week later, at the Arnstadt, Germany meet on 3 February 2007, Rybakov would win, tying his personal best of 2.38, while Ukhov finished fourth at 2.31.

International competitions

References

External links

2009 season review from IAAF

1980 births
Living people
People from Mogilev
Russian male high jumpers
Olympic athletes of Russia
Olympic bronze medalists for Russia
Olympic bronze medalists in athletics (track and field)
Athletes (track and field) at the 2004 Summer Olympics
Athletes (track and field) at the 2008 Summer Olympics
Medalists at the 2008 Summer Olympics
Goodwill Games medalists in athletics
Competitors at the 2001 Goodwill Games
World Athletics Championships athletes for Russia
World Athletics Championships winners
World Athletics Championships medalists
World Athletics Indoor Championships winners
European Athletics Championships winners
European Athletics Championships medalists
IAAF Continental Cup winners
Russian Athletics Championships winners
IAAF World Athletics Final winners